

The Magra is a  long river of Northern Italy, which runs through Pontremoli, Filattiera,  Villafranca in Lunigiana and Aulla in the province of Massa-Carrara (Tuscany); Santo Stefano di Magra, Vezzano Ligure, Arcola, Sarzana and Ameglia in the province of La Spezia (Liguria).

In Roman times, it was known as the Macra and marked the eastern boundary of the territory of Liguria.

Its most important tributary is the Vara which joins the Magra from the right within the commune of Santo Stefano di Magra.

Caprigliola bridge collapse 

In April 2020 a 260 metre long road bridge across the Magra at Albiano Magra near Aulla collapsed. Very few vehicles were using the bridge at the time due to the coronavirus lockdown then in force, and only two people were injured.

Regional Natural Park of Montemarcello-Magra-Vara
Since 1995 an area of  surrounding the Magra and Vara rivers is protected by a natural park of the regione Liguria, placed near the border with the Tuscany region. Due its biodiversity, the Regional Natural Park of Montemarcello-Magra-Vara is part of the Natura 2000 European network.

See also
 List of rivers of Italy

References

External links 

Drainage basins of the Tyrrhenian Sea
Rivers of Italy
Rivers of Tuscany
Rivers of Liguria
Rivers of the Province of La Spezia
Rivers of the Province of Massa-Carrara
Rivers of the Apennines
Lunigiana
Braided rivers in Italy